Kijuan Franks (born 31 May 1981) is a Bermudian international footballer who plays club football for Devonshire Cougars, as a defender.

Club career
Franks has played his entire club career for Devonshire Cougars. He also played for Kings in the six-a-side Island Soccer League.

International career
He made his debut for Bermuda in a March 2007 friendly match against Canada and earned a total of four caps, scoring no goals. His final international match was an August 2008 CONCACAF Gold Cup qualification match against the Cayman Islands.

References

External links

1981 births
Living people
Association football defenders
Bermudian footballers
Bermuda international footballers